Waynesburg is the name of some places in the United States:

 Waynesburg, Indiana
 Waynesburg, Crawford County, Ohio
 Waynesburg, Ohio, in Stark County
 Waynesburg, Pennsylvania
 also a former name (until 1826) of Jersey Shore, Pennsylvania